Miguel Ruiz (born December 20, 1990) is a Venezuelan professional basketball player.

Professional career
In his pro career, Ruiz has played in the 2nd-tier South American League.

National team career
Ruiz has been a member of the senior men's Venezuelan national basketball team. He played at the 2014 South American Championship, where he won a gold medal, at the 2015 FIBA Americas Championship, where he also won a gold medal, and at the 2016 South American Championship, where he won another gold medal.

He also played with Venezuela at the 2016 Olympic Games.

References

External links
FIBA Profile
FIBA Game Center Profile
Latinbasket.com Profile

1990 births
Living people
Basketball players at the 2016 Summer Olympics
Basketball players at the 2019 Pan American Games
Libertad de Sunchales basketball players
Olympic basketball players of Venezuela
Power forwards (basketball)
Regatas Corrientes basketball players
Small forwards
Sportspeople from Caracas
Trotamundos B.B.C. players
Venezuelan expatriate basketball people in Argentina
Venezuelan expatriate basketball people in Uruguay
Venezuelan men's basketball players
2019 FIBA Basketball World Cup players
Pan American Games competitors for Venezuela
Basketball players at the 2015 Pan American Games